Martin Mačković (born 4 September 1995) is a Serbian rower of Croatian and Hungarian descent. He competed at the 2020 Summer Olympics in the men's coxless pair together with Miloš Vasić and placed fifth.

References

External links

1995 births
Serbian people of Croatian descent
Serbian people of Hungarian descent
Living people
Sportspeople from Subotica
Rowers at the 2020 Summer Olympics
Serbian male rowers
Olympic rowers of Serbia